Executive Order 13996, officially titled Establishing the COVID-19 Pandemic Testing Board and Ensuring a Sustainable Public Health Workforce for COVID-19 and Other Biological Threats, was signed on January 21, 2021, and is the twelfth executive order signed by U.S. President Joe Biden. The order indicates that the United States should assemble the COVID-19 Pandemic Testing Board and guarantee a sustainable public health workforce to fight against the COVID-19 virus and other biological threats.

Provisions 
In this order, the COVID-19 Pandemic Testing Board will be established and controlled by the Coordinator of the COVID-19 Response and Counselor to the President. The board should include the Chairperson-designated representatives of a variety of management departments and institutions. Representatives from a variety of executive departments and agencies will serve on the Testing Board, as determined by the President. The Board will implement a unified government-wide testing approach including the establishment of national testing and public health workforce strategy, expanding supplies of tests, increasing laboratory testing capacity, improvement of public health workers, supporting test testing for schools and priority populations, and ensuring clarity. It will include a national testing approach and public health workforce strategy. The HHS Secretary shall also provide state and local health agencies with technical support and training for employees of public health.

Effects 
The order will lead to the establishment of the COVID-19 Pandemic Testing Board. The hope is that the COVID-19 Pandemic Testing Board will increase testing efforts and begin the process of increasing healthcare supplies through the use of the Defense Production Act.

See also 
 List of executive actions by Joe Biden
2020 United States census

References

External links 
 US Presidential Actions
 Federal Register
Executive Order on Ensuring a Lawful and Accurate Enumeration and Apportionment Pursuant to the Decennial Census

2021 in American law
Executive orders of Joe Biden
January 2021 events in the United States